Bart Bongers (October 6, 1946 – May 3, 2007) was a water polo player from The Netherlands who finished in seventh position with the Dutch Men's Team at the 1968 Summer Olympics in Mexico City, Mexico. He was born in Arnhem, Gelderland.

References
Dutch Olympic Committee
Profile of Bart Bongers

1946 births
2007 deaths
Dutch male water polo players
Olympic water polo players of the Netherlands
Water polo players at the 1968 Summer Olympics
Sportspeople from Arnhem
20th-century Dutch people